Gorges Lowther (5 November 1713 – 21 February 1792) was an Irish Member of Parliament. 

He was the son of George Lowther of Kilrue, County Meath, by his wife Jane, daughter of Sir Tristram Beresford, 3rd Baronet and Nichola Sophia Hamilton. Sir Marcus Lowther-Crofton, 1st Baronet, was his brother.

He sat in the Irish House of Commons for Ratoath from 1739 to 1760 and for County Meath from 1761 to his death. 

He married Judith, daughter of John Ussher and sister of St George St George, 1st Baron St George, and by her was the father of George Lowther.

References
 https://web.archive.org/web/20090601105535/http://www.leighrayment.com/commons/irelandcommons.htm
 http://www.stirnet.com/HTML/genie/british/ll/lowther3.htm

1713 births
1792 deaths
Politicians from County Meath
Irish MPs 1727–1760
Irish MPs 1761–1768
Irish MPs 1769–1776
Irish MPs 1776–1783
Irish MPs 1783–1790
Irish MPs 1790–1797
Members of the Parliament of Ireland (pre-1801) for County Meath constituencies